The Carpathian operation of 1915 was one of the largest military operations on the Eastern Front at 1915 in terms of scale, duration, the number of troops involved in it and the losses of the parties.

Background 

Having repulsed the counteroffensive of the Austro-Hungarian troops in late December 1914 - early January 1915, the Russian armies of the left flank of the Southwestern Front (8th and 11th) went on the offensive and again reached the Beskids, part of the passes of the main Carpathian ridge and captured almost throughout Bukovina. At the same time, the armies of the Northwestern Front, although they firmly occupied the positions to which they were withdrawn in early December (the lines of the Bzura, Pilica and Rawka rivers), they could not seize the initiative and go on the offensive against the German troops of the 9th Army.

The headquarters of the Supreme Commander Cavalry General Grand Duke Nikolai Nikolayevich (Chief Infantry General N. Yanushkevich, Quartermaster General Infantry General Yuri Danilov) did not abandon the plan of a new invasion of Germany and the capture of East Prussia. But the commander-in-chief of the armies of the Southwestern Front, General of Artillery N. Ivanov and his chief of staff, General of Infantry Mikhail Alekseyev, proposed to shift the direction of the main attack to the Carpathians, overcome the mountain barrier and reach the Hungarian Plain, which would open the way to Budapest and Vienna, and consequently led to the withdrawal of Austria-Hungary from the war.

To discuss the campaign plan for 1915 at Headquarters on January 17, 1915 meeting was held. Yuri Danilov believed that the active army would be ready for a major offensive only by April 1915, since it was then that the training of the 1915 call-up and the replenishment of artillery shells were expected to be completed. However, he also counted on some strengthening of the troops by February, and the only place where one could count on a quick and stunning success for the enemy was East Prussia - when it was invaded from the south. This opinion was supported by the Commander-in-Chief of the armies of the North-Western Front, Infantry General Nikolai Ruzsky, who arrived at the meeting. It was approved by the Supreme Commander.

However, M. Alekseyev, who was absent at the meeting, in his report on January 20, emphasized that the Austro-Hungarian troops should not be neglected, they are replenished much faster and receive help from Germany, so we should expect their new offensive from the Carpathians as early as mid-January. He proposed to strengthen the armies of the South-Western Front, but for now there is a concentration of troops for the main attack on Germany, to strike at Austria-Hungary in order to push its troops back from Przemysl, to take a more advantageous line outside the Carpathian Mountains, to bring the cavalry into operational space and create threat to Krakow from the southeast.

In a directive dated January 20, 1915 the headquarters of the armies of the Southwestern Front clearly indicated the goal and means of further actions: “It is necessary to use [with] possible energy our means of the right bank of the Vistula, inflict at least a partial defeat on the Austrians, put [in] a threatened position Hungary, occupy a more advantageous position than now, position without stretching the common strategic front. For the offensive, it was planned to use reinforced troops of the 3rd, 8th and 11th armies.

Thus, the offensive operation of the armies of the Southwestern Front received the task of reaching the Hungarian plain and moving to Budapest, with the fall of which the hope for the collapse of the alliance between Germany and Austria-Hungary and the collapse of the Habsburg monarchy was associated. The actions of the troops were subordinated to the main goal - the greatest weakening of Germany by a blow to the weakest link, as the Russian Headquarters believed.

Battle 

The Carpathian Front of World War I was a theater of conflict, part of the greater Eastern Front, centered on the Carpathian Mountains in which Austro-Hungary faced Russian forces. More than half of the 1.1 million Austro-Hungarian troops deployed on the Carpathian Front in the first four months of 1915 were killed, injured, captured, or incapacitated by disease, however, casualties became so high that the Austro-Hungarian army eventually lost detailed track of losses.

According to Prit Buttar, "The rugged peaks and passes of the Carpathians formed a natural barrier between Galicia, now in Russian hands, and the great plain of Hungary and the Danube valley.  At the time, there were five main passes through the mountains, at Wyszkov, Verecke, Uzsok, Lupkov, and Dukla."  At the beginning of 1915, the Austro-Hungarian forces along the Carpathians included (west to east) Archduke Joseph Ferdinand of Austria's Fourth Army, Svetozar Boroević's Third Army with the VII, X, and XVIII Corps, and Alexander von Linsingen's South Army.  Russian forces consisted of Aleksei Brusilov's 8th Army, with the XXIV, XII, and VII Corps, reinforced by the XXII by the end of January.  Austro-Hungary's Conrad planned a drive northwards from the Carpathians to commence on 22 January, while the Russian Army planned an attack southwards to commence on 25 January.  By 26 January, Linsingen's South Army was able to take the Verecke Pass, and advance onto the Uzsok Pass, while the Austro-Hungarian Third Army, after some initial success, had been driven back to their starting line.  On 5 February, the Russians captured the important rail link of Mezőlaborc, while Boroević's Third Army of 135,000 men, suffered almost 89,000 dead, wounded, sick, or captured.  The Russian ranks suffered as much, as the first campaign in the Carpathians came to an end. 

Kusmanek, the Przemyśl commander, estimated he had enough supplies to last until March.  This prompted Conrad to try and advance past the Russian lines along the Carpathians once again, ordering Eduard von Böhm-Ermolli's Second Army to reach Przemyśl by 12 March. Kolomea was captured by Pflanzer-Baltin on 16 February, and Stanislau on 20 February.  However, the Russians transferred their Ninth Army to that sector, and by early March, Stavka placed increased emphasis on a southern campaign.  An invasion of Hungary would be an attempt to knock the Austro-Hungarian Empire out of the war, and according to Buttar, "In addition to weakening Germany by eliminating its main ally, this would induce Romania and Italy to enter the war against the Central Powers."  Heavy snow in mid-March, and Russian counterattacks meant little real change in battlefield positions, until 20 March when the Russian offensive commenced.  On 22 March, Przemyśl surrendered.  With Conrad's front line in danger of retreat, Georg von der Marwitz's Beskidenkorps counterattacked, forcing the Russians to be driven back and their Eighth and Ninth Armies put on the defensive.

Casualties and losses

The total сasualties of Russian troops in the Carpathian operation of 1915 in killed, wounded, missing and sick are usually estimated at 1 million men, the Central Powers - at 800,000 men, including the sick. These estimates are incorrect, first of all, this concerns the сasualties of Russian troops, the size of which was taken from the statistical collection of 1925 by the authors of the Austrian official work on the history of the world war of 1914-1918 (total 1.2 million from the beginning of the war until May 1, 1915) and extrapolated to the armies of the Russian Southwestern Front.

Austrian historians determined the irretrievable losses of the Habsburg Monarchy in the Carpathian battle at 358,000 men (dead and captured), sanitary (wounded and sick) - at 435,000 men. Then this number was detailed: for January-April 1915 - 66,500 dead, 240,550 missing and captured, 180,500 wounded and 306,100 sick. The source of the calculations was not specified.

According to the authors of the Hungarian official work and German regimental histories, the сasualties of the Austro-Hungarian troops from the mouth of the Danube to Chernivtsi reached in January-April 1915 (excluding the Przemyśl garrison) 1,058 officers and 51,626 soldiers killed and died from wounds and diseases, 1,941 officers and 177,366 soldiers missing and captured, 3,039 officers and 143,884 soldiers wounded. Losses in the Przemyśl fortress were estimated at 120,000 men; in addition, it was proposed to add another 10% for "unaccounted for losses." It is unclear whether this number includes the losses of the German troops that were part of the Austro-Hungarian armies.

Calculations based on archival documents preserved in the Military Archives of the State Archives of Austria and the Military Historical Archives of the Ministry of Defense of Hungary (nominal lists of losses, reports of the material situation, reports of losses, morning reports) for January 15 - May 1, 1915 give a different result: 760 officers and 36,341 soldiers were killed, 4,914 officers (including 9 generals) and 298,865 soldiers were missing or captured, 2,212 officers and 106,056 soldiers were wounded. Since the wounded from the Przemyśl garrison were not evacuated, they were captured and counted among the prisoners.

According to updated data from regimental histories and nominal lists of losses of the German army (with additions up to December 6, 1916), assistance to the ally in the Carpathians cost 148 officers and 5,539 soldiers killed, 21 officers and 2,657 soldiers missing, 201 officers and 12,648 soldiers were wounded.

The сasualties of the Russian side in the Carpathian battle have not yet been calculated or detailed. For calculations, both nominal lists of losses (which also have many gaps) and general "urgent reports" of divisions, corps and armies for each week, which began to be compiled regularly from the end of 1914, information from combat reports (relations) and military journals. Calculations of the сasualties of the Russian armies of the Southwestern Front (3rd, 4th, 9th and 11th) for January 14 - May 1, 1915 give the following result: 570 officers and 68,866 soldiers were killed, 354 officers and 134,122 soldiers were taken prisoner, 3,080 officers and 248,823 soldiers were wounded.

During the fighting in the Carpathians from January to the end of April, the Russian armies of the Southwestern Front, according to the reports of the headquarters, taking into account the surrender of Przemyśl, captured 9 generals, 4,726 officers, 251,008  soldiers (of which 16 officers and 813 soldiers of the German army) , 600 in fortresses (mostly out of order) and 48 field guns, 363 machine guns, 2 mortars and 2 aircraft, many other military equipment and ammunition.

The trophies of the Central Powers during the Carpathian operation were more modest: 308 officers and 105,383 soldiers of the Russian army were captured, 128 machine guns and 11 guns were captured. Taking into account the data on the captured, the number of dead, due to the missing, who were not among the prisoners, may increase in the ranks of the Russian army to 623 officers and 99,136 soldiers, in the ranks of the Austro-Hungarian army, up to 964-1,280 officers and 87,190 - 98,797 soldiers, in the German troops - up to 153 officers and 7,383 soldiers.

War crimes
The fighting in the Carpathians became a tragedy for the local population as well. After the reconquest of Bukovina, the Austro-Hungarian military authorities established a strict martial law regime. The entire population was subject to re-registration, special military passes were introduced that restricted freedom of movement, and special food tariffs were introduced. Repressions began against those who collaborated with the Russians.

The Russian side also carried out repressions against the local population, which, from January 1915, assumed a nationally directed and massive character. February 4, 1915, the Supreme Commander-in-Chief, General of the Cavalry, Grand Duke Nikolai Nikolayevich ordered "starting from Bukovina, the Jews should be evicted following the retreating enemy and hostages should be taken from among the most prosperous and occupying public or other positions of the Jews." The hostages were sent in custody to the Kyiv province. Fulfilling this instruction, the commander-in-chief of the armies of the South-Western Front, N. Ivanov, ordered the Jews to be evicted deep into Russia no closer than two hundred miles from the army headquarters.

The inconsistency of such instructions caused a great deal of correspondence between the headquarters of the armies and the Southwestern Front. On March 5, confirmation came from the Chief of Staff of the Supreme Commander General of Infantry Nikolai Yanushkevich: “The Jewish population, without distinction of sex and age, in the combat area should be evicted towards the enemy. The areas occupied by the rear units of the army must be cleared of all suspicious and unreliable persons. Regardless of this, in the last places, hostages should be taken from among those who enjoy influence.

However, the eviction "towards the enemy" was not feasible under the conditions of a positional war: the Jewish population from Galicia and Bukovina was evicted deep into Russia. On March 27, Yanushkevich telegraphed to the headquarters of the fronts: “Information is coming from the Minister of the Interior about the attempted eviction of the Jews from Galicia deep into Russia. This is unacceptable, we already have too many of them. It was ordered to drive them forward behind the Austrians, and in the areas in the rear of the troops, who had long been occupied, to select from the most wealthy and important among the population and influence of the hostages, who should be evicted to Russia in the area of settled settlement, but under guard, that is, in prisons, and property sequester them. Rumors reached the Supreme Commander that with the movement forward, the inhabitants of the Jews were not evicted. I ask you to strictly confirm this requirement, and to confiscate the property of those who showed hostility in the slightest degree or are suspected of espionage. For the eviction of the hostages, the Minister of Internal Affairs has planned the provinces of Poltava and Chernigov, that is, counties outside the theater of war. On April 7, the demand for the strict implementation of these repressive measures was confirmed by the chief supply officer of the armies of the Southwestern Front, Infantry General A. Mavrin. On April 21, 1915, the chief of staff of the 8th Army Corps, Major General Georgy Viranovsky, reported to the headquarters of the 8th Army on the execution of this order.

Ethnic segregation began in the ranks of the Russian army. On February 12, 1915, the Chief of Staff of the Supreme Commander, Infantry General N. Yanushkevich, accused soldiers from the German colonists of "unreliability" and ordered them to be sent to the Caucasian front (with the exception of militias and non-combatants). The "defectors" were ordered to open fire: "in general, no cruelty will be excessive."

In the 11th army blockading Przemyśl, the commander of the infantry general Andrey Selivanov ordered the transfer of 400 disarmed soldiers from the German colonists under escort from the Cossacks to the 58th and 81st infantry divisions to be involved in earthworks. At the first case of "dishonest service", it was ordered "to bring them to the strictest responsibility under the laws of war." These teams were placed under special supervision; On March 4, the Chief of Staff of the 11th Army, Major General V. von Weil, ordered the corps commanders to report weekly what work was entrusted to the German colonists, how they perform these works, how they relate to their position, whether they influence other soldiers.

Until the end of the siege of the fortress, there was not a single case of German colonists evading work or any "harmful influence" on other soldiers. Moreover, the heads of divisions, the commander of the siege artillery and the commander of the army telegraph company noted the excellent performance of service by soldiers of German nationality and in a number of cases returned their weapons to them.

Outcome
Prit Buttar noted, "A glance at the maps of the campaign shows the futility of such operations for both sides. The bloodshed was enormous for the modest gains and losses, ranking the Carpathians fighting as amongst the most ineffective of the entire war."

References

Eastern Front (World War I)